Hackensack Cemetery is a cemetery located in Hackensack, New Jersey, United States, founded by Baptists, Dutch Reformed, and Congregational benefactors in the 1890s, as a result of overcrowding in local churchyards and availability of open space. The same group of prominent Hackensack men organized the Johnson Free Public Library.

Unmarked notable burials
 Simon Douglas (1843–1950), former slave who lived to become the last US Civil War soldier in the state of New Jersey
 Victor Hugo Green (1892–1960), publisher of The Negro Motorist Green Book travel guides
 Archibald C. Hart (1873–1935), represented New Jersey's 6th congressional district from 1912–1913 and 1913–1917.
 Stan Pitula, pitcher for the Cleveland Indians
 John R. Ramsey (1862–1933), represented New Jersey's 6th congressional district from 1917 to 1921.
 Arshavir Shirakian (1900–1973), Armenian national hero and avenger of the Armenian genocide
 Charles H. Voorhis (1833–1896), represented New Jersey's 5th congressional district from 1879 to 1881.

See also
 Bergen County Cemeteries

References

External links
 
 

Hackensack, New Jersey
Cemeteries in Bergen County, New Jersey